Alexander Raake (born in Düsseldorf in 1971) is a professor heading the Audiovisual Technology Group at Technische Universität Ilmenau since 2015.

Biography
Between 1991 and 1997, he studied electrical engineering at RWTH Aachen University and at Télécom ParisTech (ENST); where he was a research scientist and worked on the quality of VoIP (Voice over Internet Protocol) voice transmission as part of his dissertation at the Institute for Communication Acoustics of Ruhr University Bochum.
In 2004 and 2005, Raake did research work in Orsay, France, where he developed methods for measuring and modeling speech intelligibility in virtual chat rooms.

In 2005, he joined Telekom Innovation Laboratories in Berlin as a senior scientist in the Quality and Usability lab. From 2009 to 2015, he was junior professor at Technische Universität Berlin, heading the Assessment of IP-based Applications group.

Research topics
 VoIP-based voice transmission systems
 Virtual communication environments for video conferencing with multiple participants
 Multi-modal communication systems
 Audio-visual quality of IP-based video
 Quality of Experience (QoE) for 3D-audio and 3D-video

Honors and awards
 2007: Award of Information Technology Society (ITG) of VDE for outstanding research publications from young ITG scientists
 2011: Johann-Philipp-Reis Award

References

External links 
 Website from Alexander Raake at TU Ilmenau
 Website from Alexander Raake at TU Berlin
 Website from Alexander Raake at Deutschen Telekom Innovation Laboratories

1971 births
German electrical engineers
Scientists from Düsseldorf
Living people
Academic staff of Technische Universität Ilmenau
Engineers from North Rhine-Westphalia